Markus Eder (born 30 November 1990 in Bruneck) is an Italian freestyle skier. He was a participant at the 2014 Winter Olympics in Sochi.

References

External links
 

1990 births
Freestyle skiers at the 2014 Winter Olympics
Living people
Olympic freestyle skiers of Italy
Italian male freestyle skiers
Sportspeople from Bruneck
Germanophone Italian people
21st-century Italian people